Brian Roloff (born August 8, 1986) is an American professional ice hockey forward who currently plays for the Ravensburg Towerstars of the German DEL2 league.

Career 
Roloff grew up in West Seneca, New York. Prior to turning professional, Roloff played two seasons in the United States Hockey League (USHL) with the Green Bay Gamblers, and then played four years of college hockey at University of Vermont with the Vermont Catamounts men's ice hockey team. After he completed his collegiate career, Roloff played five games in the AHL for the Providence Bruins at the end of the 2009–10 AHL season, and the following season he was signed by the Portland Pirates to an AHL Standard Player's Contract.

In 2011, Roloff opted to continue his career overseas, embarking on a three-stint with the Augsburg Panthers of the Deutsche Eishockey Liga (DEL), the highest level of professional ice hockey in Germany. In his third season with the club, he was slowed down by a shoulder injury and then signed with DEL2 side Ravensburg Towerstars prior to the 2014-15 season. In his first year with the Ravensburg team, Roloff made 54 appearances, scoring 25 goals while assisting on 27 more. He then had his contract renewed for the 2015-16 campaign.

References

External links

Brian Roloff's profile at del-2.org

1986 births
American men's ice hockey centers
Augsburger Panther players
Green Bay Gamblers players
Living people
Portland Pirates players
Providence Bruins players
Vermont Catamounts men's ice hockey players
Ice hockey players from New York (state)